Smak ciszy is the second studio album by the Polish heavy metal band Turbo. It was released in 1985 in Poland through Klub płytowy "Razem". The cover art was created by Jacek Brzosowski and photographs by Andrzej Szozda.

Smak ciszy is dedicated to Iron Maiden.

Track listing

Personnel

 Turbo
Grzegorz Kupczyk - vocal
Wojciech Hoffmann - guitar
Bogusz Rutkiewicz  - bass guitar
Andrzej Łysów - guitar
Alan Sors - drums

 Production
 Jacek Brzosowski - artwork
 Halina Jarczyk - engineer assistant
 Andrzej Szozda - photography
 Krzysztof Domaszczyński - producer
 Marek Wajcht - producer
 Jacek Mastykarz - recording
 Dodek Żywioł - technician

Release history

References

1985 albums
Turbo (Polish band) albums
Polish-language albums